Neoeutrypanus is a genus of beetles in the family Cerambycidae containing the following species:

 Neoeutrypanus decorus (Bates, 1881)
 Neoeutrypanus generosus (Monné & Martins, 1976)
 Neoeutrypanus glaucus (Melzer, 1931)
 Neoeutrypanus incertus (Bates, 1864)
 Neoeutrypanus inustus (Monné & Martins, 1976)
 Neoeutrypanus maculatus Monné, 1985
 Neoeutrypanus mutilatus (Germar, 1824)
 Neoeutrypanus nitidus (White, 1855)
 Neoeutrypanus nobilis (Bates, 1864)
 Neoeutrypanus sobrinus (Melzer, 1935)

References

Acanthocinini